Restless is the sixth studio album by Murray Head. It was released in 1984.

Track listing
All songs composed by Murray Head unless noted.

"When You're in Love" (Murray Head, Phil Palmer, Peter Veitch) - 3:34
"Catching Eddie at It" - 3:16
"Modern Boy" - 4:37
"Peril in Venice" - 5:40
"Salvation (Missionary Madness)" - 4:05
"Mario" - 3:34
"African Tourists" - 4:04
"Hold Me" - 3:59
"I Don't Care" - 3:44
"Maybe Tomorrow" - 5:21

Personnel
Murray Head - vocals, guitar
Danny Cummings - percussion
Anthony Head - backing vocals
Simon Jeffes - violin, string arrangements
Ian Maidman - bass guitar
Trevor Murrell- drums
Phil Palmer - guitar
Geoffrey Richardson - guitar, viola
Peter Veitch - piano
Gavyn Wright - string arrangements

References

Murray Head albums
1984 albums
Albums produced by Steve Nye
Virgin Records albums